Barquero is a surname. Notable people with the surname include:

Efraín Barquero (1931–2020), Chilean poet
Francisco Aguilar Barquero (1857–1924), Costa Rican politician
Laura Barquero (born 2001), Spanish pair skater
Rafael Barquero (born 1934), Costa Rican judoka

Spanish-language surnames